Prominvestbank (Kyiv, Ukraine) (full name - Joint Stock Commercial Industrial & Investment Bank (closed stock company)) is a bank based in the Ukraine that was formed in August 1992. Its overall history goes back more than 86 years.

History

The history of the Bank goes back to the 1920s when pursuant to the government’s decision “On Supreme Council of the National Economy” the Industrial Bank (Prombank) was established as a central financial institution for industry, and on the 1st of  January 1923, the All-Ukrainian Office of Prombank was opened in Kharkiv. The network of branches steadily expanded with a view of supporting the leading industrial enterprises. Following the reorganization of Prombank in 1928 into a Bank for Long-Term Lending to Industrial and Electric Power Companies – BDK (Prombank), its strategy changed to focus on providing long-term finance to the construction industry.  As a result, approx. 2/3 of all investments into capital construction in the early 1930s were made through the Bank. In 1936-37 the All-Ukrainian Office of Prombank was re-organised into the Office of Authorized Prombank of the USSR based in Kiev (now Kyiv, Ukraine). During the reconstruction period that followed the 2nd World War, the Bank participated actively in restoring various key industrial enterprises, including the reconstruction of Dnipro Hydroelectric Power Station, development of the Donbass coal-mines and other projects of national importance.

In 1959, the bank was reorganized into the All-Union Bank for Financing of Capital Investments (Budbank of the USSR). It assumed the operations of the Bank for Financing of Communal and House Building (Tsekombank), communal banks, Agrarian Bank and Trade Bank. As a result, in addition to financing industrial, transport and communication enterprises, the bank started lending to the education and housing sectors. During this period Budbank was responsible for financing approx. 70% of all capital investments in the Ukrainian economy. In 1987, the Central Committee of the Communist Party and the Council of Ministers of the USSR adopted a resolution under which Budbank was reorganized into the Industrial and Construction Bank of the USSR (Prombudbank of the USSR).

The independence of Ukraine opened a new chapter of the Bank’s development. On the 26th of August 1992 Prombudbank was re-organised into its present form: the Ukrainian Joint-Stock Commercial Industrial and Investment Bank (Prominvestbank of Ukraine). On June 27, 2001 the name of the bank was changed to Joint Stock Commercial Industrial & Investment Bank (Prominvestbank).

Prominvestbank has, since its beginning in the 1920s, grown to become one of Ukraine’s leading financial institutions. Through its various re-incarnations the Bank has continued to play a lead role in supporting the industrial sector of Ukraine and the development of the national economy – a role that is as important now as it was over eighty years ago. Since Ukrainian independence,  Prominvestbank has invested almost USD 67 billion for the development of the Ukrainian economy.

In October, due to a sharp outflow of clients' funds, the bank's liquidity significantly decreased, so the resolution of the Board of the National Bank of Ukraine dated October 7, 2008 introduced a temporary administration in the bank. Among the possible investors of PIB were the head of Delta Bank Mykola Laguna and the president of the Russian investment and financial group "Intelinx" Dmitry Klyuyev. However, the deal did not take place.

Location
The head office of Prominvestbank is located at 12, Shevchenko lane, Kyiv 01001, Ukraine. Prominvestbank has more than 850  branches in all regions of Ukraine.

About

Prominvestbank is a universal commercial bank and one of the leading banks in Ukraine. In January 2009 Prominvestbank was one of Ukraine’s largest banks in terms of assets (UAH 27.5 billion), credit portfolio (UAH 24.1 billion) and capital (UAH 3.3 billion). The bank's assets in 2015 were UAH 41.65 billion, its net worth as of the end of 2015 was negative and was estimated at UAH 12.272 billion, whereas it was positive in 2014 and stood at UAH 7.948 billion.

Prominvestbank provides a wide range of services to private and corporate customers (more than 4.3 million private and corporate customers). The Bank’s customers include a number of leading enterprises in the following sectors: mining & smelting, machine building (inc. aircraft construction), transport and agro-industrial, as well as in all other sectors. During 2007 Prominvestbank granted UAH 48.5 billion of loans, including UAH 34.8 billion granted to corporate customers, the largest part of which went to current operations, investments and mortgage loans. The most significant credit support, UAH 15.7 billion, has been provided to industrial enterprises. Prominvestbank also actively maintained its support to agro-industrial enterprises and granted loans and guarantees worth UAH 1.4 billion to their development. Retail banking is one of the main priorities of Prominvestbank’s overall strategy. The Bank continues to actively take measures to increase the volume and range of services it offers to its private customers.

Significant loans to the metallurgy, mechanical engineering, transport, construction, agriculture contributes to the development of these branched of industry. Three times in 2003, 2004 and in 2006 Prominvestbank was awarded The Bank of the Year for Ukraine by the world known English magazine "The Banker".

Sanctions and change of ownership
In 2016 main shareholder of Prominvestbank with 99.4% of all shares was Russian state enterprise 'Bank for Development and Foreign Economic Affairs (Vnesheconombank)'. On March 15, 2017, the Ukrainian President Petro Poroshenko imposed sanctions on Prominvestbank (and other Russian state-owned banks operating in Ukraine: Vnesheconombank, VTB Bank, BM Bank, Sberbank, and VS Bank (Ukrainian: ВіЕс Банк)) as part of its continued sanctions on Russia for its annexation of Crimea and involvement in the War in Donbass. After that, Vnesheconombank bank tried to sell its Ukrainian subsidiary;  unsuccessfully. At Sochi in February, 2018, Vnesheconombank's Sergey Gorkov said they hoped to sell its Ukrainian subsidiary, Prominvestbank, by May 2018. In March 2020 a 99.77% stake in Prominvestbank was sold to a company named Fortifay, who sold these shares in October 2020 to Cypriot company Luregio Limited (Luregio Limited's ultimate beneficiar is Serhiy Tihipko).

In February 2022, the liquidation process was started based on decisions of the Board of the National Bank on the revocation of the banking license and liquidation of Prominvestbank.

References

See also 
List of banks in Ukraine

Banks of Ukraine
Sanctioned due to Russo-Ukrainian War